Maksymilian Pingot (born 1 April 2003) is a Polish professional footballer who plays as a centre-back for I liga club Odra Opole, on loan from Lech Poznań.

Career

Early career
Pingot started his career in his hometown of Konin, training with Sparta until the age of 13.

Lech Poznań
In 2016, he joined Lech Poznań's academy. On 10 April 2021, he made his professional debut with Lech Poznań II in a 1–3 away league win against Olimpia Grudziądz.

At the start of 2022, he joined the first team roster. On 9 July 2022, he made his competitive debut for Lech, coming on as a substitute in the 74th minute of a 0–2 Super Cup loss against Raków Częstochowa. A week later, he made his Ekstraklasa debut as a starter in a 0–2 home loss against Stal Mielec.

Loan to Odra
On 2 January 2023, Pingot was loaned to I liga side Odra Opole until June 2024.

Career statistics

Club

References

External links
 
 

2003 births
Living people
People from Konin
Polish footballers
Poland under-21 international footballers
Association football defenders
Lech Poznań II players
Lech Poznań players
Odra Opole players
Ekstraklasa players
II liga players